STS-112 (ISS assembly flight 9A) was an 11-day Space Shuttle mission to the International Space Station (ISS) flown by . Space Shuttle Atlantis was launched on 7 October 2002 at 19:45 UTC from the Kennedy Space Center's launch pad 39B to deliver the 28,000 pound Starboard 1 (S1) truss segment to the Space Station. Ending a 4.5-million-mile journey, Atlantis landed at 15:44 UTC on 18 October 2002 on runway 33 at the Kennedy Space Center's Shuttle Landing Facility.

During the launch, the ET bipod ramp shed a chunk of foam that caused a dent ~4" wide and 3" deep into the metal SRB-ET Attach Ring near the bottom of the left Space Shuttle Solid Rocket Booster. Prior to the next mission (STS-113), an upper-level decision was made at NASA to continue with launches as scheduled. The launch subsequent to that was the Space Shuttle Columbia disaster, the ill-fated STS-107.

Space Shuttle Atlantis had been scheduled to visit the International Space Station (ISS) again on the STS-114 mission in March 2003; however, due to the loss of Columbia, all Space Shuttles, including Atlantis, were temporarily grounded. Due to rescheduling of missions, Atlantis did not fly again until STS-115 on 9 September 2006.

Crew

Mission payload

Starboard 1 (S1) truss segment

The S1 truss segment, which provides structural support for the Space Station radiators was the main payload of STS-112 mission.

The Boeing Company (along with Lockheed Martin) started manufacturing the truss in May 1998 at Michoud. The work was completed in March 1999. The S1 was shipped by aircraft to the KSC Operations and Checkout Building in October 1999 for flight processing. In June 2002, the truss was handed over to NASA for final preparations and pre-flight checks at the Space Station Processing Facility.

Crew Equipment Translation Aid 
Atlantis also delivered the Crew Equipment Translation Aid (CETA) Cart to the Space Station. The CETA cart was attached to the Mobile Transporter (launched on STS-110) to be used by assembly crews on later missions.

Mission experiments 
STS-112 carried several science experiments to the space station including the Plant Generic Bioprocessing Apparatus (PGBA), Commercial Generic Bioprocessing Apparatus (CGBA), the Protein Crystal Growth Single-locker Thermal Enclosure System housing the Protein Crystallization Apparatus for Microgravity (PCG-STES-PCAM) and samples for the Zeolite Crystal Growth Furnace (ZCG) experiment.

Shuttle processing
Launch preparations for STS-112 mission were sightly delayed due to tiny cracks found within the plumbing of ''Atlantis propulsion system on 17 June 2002 by an inspector. The cracks were in metal flow liners inside the main liquid hydrogen fuel lines that feed the shuttle's three main engines. Although there were no cracks in the actual fuel pipes themselves, the concern was that metal pieces from the flow liners might break off and fly into the engines. In such a worst-case scenario, the debris can potentially trigger a catastrophic engine shutdown, which in turn could lead to the loss of the crew and the shuttle.

Mission timeline

7 October (Flight Day 1 – Launch)

Space Shuttle Atlantis lifted off from Launch Pad 39B of the Kennedy Space Center at 19:45:51 GMT through mostly clear blue skies. There were no problems reported during the countdown, and the ascent conformed to the standard timeline (see Space Shuttle – Mission Profile – Launch). For the first time in Space Shuttle history, a "rocketcam" video camera mounted to the upper part of Atlantis external tank returned live video of the flight to NASA flight controllers. The video was near perfect until the two solid rocket boosters were jettisoned. At that point, the exhaust from the separation motors fogged the camera lens and made the rest of the video difficult to see.

Later, NASA announced that it was looking into a problem with explosive bolts that failed to fire properly during the launch. Immediately before the twin solid rocket boosters fired into life, only one set of pyrotechnics in ten explosive bolts exploded when commanded to do so. All 10 nuts exploded as planned, but NASA was interested in finding out an explanation for the unexpected anomaly.

Arguably the most significant event from this launch was the ET bipod ramp shedding a chunk of foam, estimated to be ~4"x5"x12", that broke away and hit the lower left SRB-ET Attach Ring near the Integrated Electronics Assembly (IEA) box causing a dent ~4" wide and 3" deep into the solid metal. Prior to approval for the next mission, the situation was analyzed and NASA decided to press ahead under the justification that "The ET is safe to fly with no new concerns (and no added risk)" of further foam strikes. This fateful decision set the stage for the STS-107 tragedy just two launches later. The CAIB report did not highlight the significance of video data from this being the first flight with the ET Camera.

8 October (Flight Day 2 – Rendezvous and docking preparations) 

On Flight Day 2, the STS-112 crew settled into preparations for the next day's rendezvous and docking with the International Space Station. After the wake up call went at 4:46 am CDT, the crew began its first full day on orbit. Pilot Pamela Melroy assisted Mission Specialists David Wolf and Piers Sellers in a checkout of spacewalk suits and equipment. Commander Jeff Ashby worked with the prime robotic arm operator, Mission Specialist Sandy Magnus, to verify the arm's readiness. Ashby and Magnus powered up the arm for a video survey of Atlantis' payload bay. The crew also completed the setting up of the orbiter docking system's centerline camera, extended the orbiter's spring-loaded ring that will make first contact, and checked out rendezvous tools.

During the day, the STS-112 crew successfully completed three Orbital Maneuvering System (OMS) burns to boost the shuttle into the station's orbit and refine its approach path to the station.

Astronaut Wolf also checked-out the Spatial Heterodyne Imager for Mesospheric Radicals or the SHIMMER experiment sponsored by the Naval Research Lab. The SHIMMER experiment uses an ultraviolet sensing camera to observe the Earth's atmosphere at 40–90 kilometers looking for possible ozone loss. The experiment proved balky, but with help from Mission Control the crew worked out steps to ready the gear for observations during the mission.

9 October (Flight Day 3 – Docking) 

Space Shuttle Atlantis docked to the Space Station at 15:17 GMT to begin a week of joint operations for the STS-112 and Expedition 5 crews. With commander Jeffrey Ashby at the controls, Atlantis docking system engaged the Pressurized Mating Adapter-2 (Destiny Laboratory's forward docking port) in the front of the space station as the two spacecraft sailed 245 miles above central Asia at five miles per second. Crew members of Atlantis were the first visitors for the Expedition 5 station crew who arrived at the outpost the first week of June 2002.

Following pressure checks, station science officer Peggy Whitson asked Commander Ashby if he had brought the salsa that she had asked for. When Ashby replied that he had, Whitson said "OK, we'll let you in". The hatches between Atlantis and the Space Station were opened at 16:51 GMT and astronaut Ashby floated into the Destiny Module and immediately embraced Whitson. Mission Specialist Sandra Magnus followed next, followed by the rest of ''Atlantis STS-112 crew members. They were greeted by the three member station crew.

After a safety briefing from station commander Valery Korzun, the combined crews split up and began preparing for a busy day of work. Astronaut Pamela Melroy, cosmonaut Korzun, and Mission Specialists Dave Wolf, Piers Sellers, and Fyodor Yurchikhin configured the spacesuits for EVA 1. Magnus and Whitson reviewed robotic arm operations for moving the new truss segment into place.

10 October (Flight Day 4 – EVA 1) 

The workday began at 3 am CDT with a musical wakeup call to Atlantis crew from Mission Control, Houston. Earlier on Flight Day 4 astronauts Whitson and Magnus used the station's Canadarm2 robotic arm to grapple the S1 truss structure, remove it from Atlantis payload bay, and move it to the starboard end the S0 section. Four remotely operated motorized bolts locked the two truss segments together at 8:36 am CDT.

Simultaneously, Astronauts Dave Wolf and Piers Sellers prepared for the mission's first spacewalk. EVA 1 was the 44th spacewalk staged to support the space station assembly and maintenance. The two astronauts exited the Quest Airlock at about 11:21 am EDT. Wolf's spacesuit had solid red stripes for identification, while Sellers donned an all white spacesuit. As Wolf worked to accomplish to connect power, data and fluid lines between the S0 and the S1 trusses, Sellers, on his first spacewalk, released the locks on three folded-up radiators mounted to the S1, allowing S1's radiators to be oriented for optimal cooling.

The spacewalking astronauts worked for seven hours and one minute outside the space station, 31 minutes longer than expected due to a problem with the Canadarm2. The glitch forced Wolf to complete installation of a television camera system on the far end of the truss without the assistance of the robot arm. The only other problem of EVA 1 came near the end of the spacewalk when Wolf reported his helmet earphones appeared to be losing power.

Throughout the spacewalk, astronaut Melroy offered guidance and advice to the spacewalkers and keeping them on schedule. Shuttle Commander Jeff Ashby operated the shuttle robotic arm, providing camera views for documentation. Following a tool inventory check and cleanup activities, Wolf and Sellers re-entered Quest. The Airlock was re-pressurized at 5:22 pm CDT to end EVA 1.

11 October (Flight Day 5 – Off duty and transfers) 

On Flight Day 5, the combined shuttle and space station crew took several hours of off-duty time. Then they began transfer operations between the vehicles and prepared for mission's second spacewalk. The crew moved a number of scientific experiments back and forth between the shuttle and the ISS to return completed experiments to Earth and deploy new experiments at the ISS. Transfer items included a set of liver cell tissue samples from an experiment studying the function of human liver cells in microgravity, moved from the station onto the shuttle for return to Earth.

Payload experiments such as Marshall Space Flight Center's protein crystal growth thermal enclosures for growing high-quality protein crystals in micro-gravity experiments were moved to and from the station. Seven water containers were transferred to the station. Commander Jeff Ashby initiated a Nitrogen transfer process that moved about 15 pounds of the gas from Atlantis to the station by the end of the day.

STS-112 spacewalkers David Wolf and Piers Sellers, assisted by Pilot Pamela Melroy, readied the EVA equipment They recharged water on the extravehicular mobility unit (EMU), configured their tools and prepared the Quest airlock.

The crew also participated in several live media interviews. Astronauts Magnus, Wolf and Sellers discussed about EVA 1 and the first-time experiences in space with CBS Radio Network and Cable News Network (CNN). Speaking to CBS News, Wolf told that manual work Piers and himself did at the end of EVA 1 to install the S1's outboard nadir external camera got their heart rates up to over 170 per minute. The spacewalkers were not able to use the Station's Canadarm 2 as a result of a software glitch.

Russian cosmonauts Valery Korzun, Sergei Treschev and Fyodor Yurchikhin participated in several interviews with the Russian press. Shortly before sleep, the crew reviewed procedures for EVA 2.

12 October (Flight Day 6 – EVA 2) 

13 October (Flight Day 7) 

14 October (Flight Day 8 – EVA 3) 

15 October (Flight Day 9) 

16 October (Flight Day 10 – Undocking) 

17 October (Flight Day 11 – Landing preparations) 

18 October (Flight Day 12 – Landing) 

.

Spacewalks

Shuttlecam
A camera mounted to the shuttle's external tank captured Atlantis ascent to orbit. This was the first time such footage was recorded. However, after solid rocket booster separation, the camera was fogged with the propellant, and was rendered unusable. The camera was moved downward after STS-112.

In the response to the Space Shuttle Columbia disaster (STS-107), the camera was also used on all subsequent missions to capture images of the falling debris from the external tank.

Wake-up calls
NASA began a tradition of playing music to astronauts during the Gemini program, which was first used to wake up a flight crew during Apollo 15.
Each track is specially chosen, often by their families, and usually has a special meaning to an individual member of the crew, or is applicable to their daily activities.

Media

See also

List of human spaceflights
List of International Space Station spacewalks
List of Space Shuttle missions
List of spacewalks and moonwalks 1965–1999
Outline of space science

References

External links
 
 NASA mission summary 
 Status reports – Detailed NASA status reports for each day of the mission.
 STS-112 Video Highlights 

Space Shuttle missions
Spacecraft launched in 2002
Articles containing video clips